John Freke may refer to:

 John Freke (MP) (c. 1591–1641), English politician
 John Freke (surgeon) (1688–1756), English surgeon
 John Redmond Freke (d. 1764), politician in Ireland